The hornyhead turbot (Pleuronichthys verticalis) is a species of flatfish in the family Pleuronectidae. Its native habitat is the subtropical waters of the eastern Pacific, from Point Reyes in California to Magdalena Bay in Baja California, and the northern and central eastern parts of the Gulf of California.

Diet

The diet of the hornyhead turbot consists mainly of zoobenthos organisms, including amphipods, polychaetes and clam siphons.

References

hornyhead turbot
Fish of Mexican Pacific coast
Fish of the Gulf of California
hornyhead turbot
Taxa named by David Starr Jordan